The list of Chi Omega sisters includes initiated and honorary members of Chi Omega.

Notable alumnae

Business

Entertainment

Government

Literature

Philanthropy

Science and education

Sports

References

External links
Outstanding Chi Omegas

Chi Omega
sisters